Cadillac Center station is a Detroit People Mover station in Downtown Detroit, Michigan. It is located at the intersection of Gratiot Avenue and Library Street. The station takes its name from Cadillac Square, which is adjacent to the Campus Martius Park. It is partially covered by the One Campus Martius parking garage, which was built over the station and track in the early 2000s. The station and garage are connected on the ground level.

The People Mover shut down temporarily on March 30, 2020, due to decreased ridership amid the COVID-19 pandemic. The system has since resumed service, but as of June 2022, Cadillac Center remains closed, with trains bypassing the station and continuing to Broadway.

See also

 List of rapid transit systems
 List of United States rapid transit systems by ridership
 Metromover
 Transportation in metropolitan Detroit

References

External links
 DPM station overview
Station from Google Maps Street View

Detroit People Mover stations
Railway stations in the United States opened in 1987
1987 establishments in Michigan